Lismore Airport  is a regional airport located  south of Lismore in the Northern Rivers region of New South Wales, Australia.

It features a modern terminal building, with some secure parking facilities. The airport sustained 'extensive damage' during the 2022 eastern Australia floods.

Rex Airlines flew between Sydney and Lismore for many years, before dropping the route in June 2022.

Statistics
Lismore Airport was ranked 54th in Australia for the number of revenue passengers served in financial year 2009-2010 but dropped in 2010–11.

See also
List of airports in New South Wales

References

External links
 Official website

Airports in New South Wales
Lismore, New South Wales